Pierre Yovanovitch (born 17 August 1965) is a French interior designer. He was born in Nice.

Biography 

Yovanovitch’s career started in 1990. He worked with Pierre Cardin on the men’s fashion lines of the couture house, first in Brussels then in Paris, until 2000. In 2001, he started his own Agency “Pierre Yovanovitch Architecture d’Intérieur”.  He produced residential, institutional and commercial projects in France, Belgium, Switzerland, England, Israel and the United States.

In 2016, the Pierre Yovanovitch House moved into a mansion built in the early 18th century, in the 2nd arrondissement of Paris, rue Beauregard. A team of more than 30 people occupies a mansion completely remodelled and restored, where architecture, interior architecture, design, decoration and contemporary art cohabitate.

In the spring of 2018, Yovanovitch opened his first address across the Atlantic on Madison Avenue in New York.

Work: style and inspirations 
Yovanovitch's work utilises what the magazine AD France designates as a new style "Made in France": French craftsmanship with influences and talents from elsewhere.

A collector of design and contemporary art, Pierre Yovanovitch is particularly interested in the creators of the countries of the North (Frits Henningsen, Paavo Tynell, Flemming Lassen, Rasmus Fenhann, Harri Koskinnen), American (Paul Laszlo, Paul Frankl, Robsjohn-Gibbings, James Mont, Harvey Probber) and French (Robert Mallet-Stevens, Paul Dupré-Lafon, Jean-Michel Frank) from the 1930s to 1960s. He also likes applied arts like ceramics and design. In terms of architecture, he likes to mention the 17th century French but also the contemporaries: Sanaa, Tadao Ando, Kengo Kuma, John Pawson, Herzog & De Meuron. Collector, Pierre Yovanovitch is passionate about design and contemporary art that he integrates into his projects. Artists like Georg Baselitz, Rosemarie Trockel, Johan Creten, Nendo, Thomas Schütte, Wilhelm Sasnal, Camille Henrot and Adel Abdessemed. He designs his own furniture in solid wood, metal, or ceramic.

Career and projects 
Yovanovitch showcased his apartment at the Biennale des Antiquaires in Paris, at the exhibition of the Eric Philippe Gallery dedicated to the Swedish designer Axel Einar Hjorth and the decorative movement of the 1920s called "Swedish Grace". In 2010, Pierre Yovanovitch was the only French to appear in the "AD100" ranking of the best interior designers and decorators in the world, published by the Architectural Digest. 

Yovanovitch works in large master apartments or mansions in residential, institutional, hotel and commercial projects such as; an eighteenth century castle in Haute Provence, a penthouse in a chalet in Andermatt-Suisse, a mansion in Brussels. Yovanovitch created the interior design of the Hotel Marignan located in the Golden Triangle in Paris, which opened at the end of 2012. In early 2015, he finished the first Christian Louboutin Beauty flagship, Vero Dodat in Paris. In 2015 a scenography of the first exhibition in the Brussels Royal Skating Rink, a private museum dedicated to contemporary art, was entrusted to Yovanovitch. In 2016, the Kering Group commissioned Yovanovitch to design the offices of the Presidency in its head office. In 2018, Yovanovitch designed the architecture and decoration of the Quinta da Côrte, port and guest house in the heart of the Douro, Portugal.

Scenography and art 

Yovanovitch creates exhibition scenographies: He took part in the AD Intérieurs events organized by the French magazine AD from 2010 to 2014, at Artcurial (2010, 2011, 2012), at the Clos des Bernardins (2013), then at the Decorative Arts (2014) in Paris each time creating a play around a given theme. He also designed the Puiforcat stand for the Hermès group at Maison & Objet in January 2011, the Galeries Aveline and Christophe de Quénetain stands at the TEFAF in Maastricht in 2014, and in 2016, and that of the Galerie Neuse at the last Biennale des Antiques then at TEFAF 2017, for the third year in a row.

In 2013, he staged the content of the sale "Scandinavian Design vs. Brazilian" for the house of sales Piasa Rive Gauche. Exercise he reiterates for the inaugural sale of Brazilian and Scandinavian design of Maison Piasa in Belgium within the Royal Ice Rink on 26 June 2018. In 2016, he was commissioned by the gallery owner Kamel Mennour to do the interior design of a first gallery located on avenue Matignon in Paris, opened in May of that same year. Then also for a second gallery in London in the Mayfair district, at 51 Brook Street, opened in October 2016.

In 2018, Yovanovitch created the scenography of the R & Company stand for the Design Fair / Miami Basel in Switzerland, and presented several new pieces of furniture from his creation.

Invited by Villa Noailles - Centre of Art of National Interest - Yovanovitch chaired the jury of the 3rd International Festival of Interior Architecture in Toulon as part of Design Parade 2018. On this occasion he creates an exhibition entitled "L Miss OOPS erotomania presented in the former bishopric of Toulon from 28 June to 30 September 2018.

Furniture creation 
In September 2017, Yovanovitch unveiled to the public pieces of furniture at the New York design gallery R & Company. They were specially designed for the exhibition - which he named "OOPS".

Articles 

 Tetsuya Toyoda, "Pierre Yovanovitch", DESIGNERS’, Japan, October 2009, p. 124
 Serge Gleizes, "Le luxe discret de Yovanovitch", IDEAT, France, October 2010, p. 146
 Adrian Von Moos, "Lo studio della semplicità", AD Italia, mai 2010, p. 170
 Gabriel Martel, "Parmi les 100 meilleurs au monde : Pierre Yovanovitch", MAROC PRESTIGE, March 2010, p. 100
 Jean Bond Rafferty, "Self taught chic", MODERN, USA, Spring 2011, p. 122
 Danielle Miller, "Pièce de résistance", STELLA, UK, May 2011, p. 54
 Antoine Moreno, "Combles d’élégance", Le Vif/L'Express, Belgium, October 2011, p. 65
 Robert Colona d'Istria, "Rive gauche grandeur", HOUSE & GARDEN, UK, November 2011, p. 212
 Ellen Himefarb, "Best in class", INTERNATIONAL ARCHITECTURE & DESIGN, Canada, Spring 2012, p. 34
 Marion Bley, "Un château d’aujourd’hui", AD France, May 2012, p. 173
 Aude De la Conte, "The 10 Leading French Designers" HOUSE & GARDEN, UK, July 2012, p. 111
 Cédric Morisset, "L’élégance à la Française", Air France Magazine, September 2012, p. 100
 Catherine Saint-Jean, "Les décorateurs français : des superstars", FIGARO, France, 16 October 2012, p. 3
 Wendy Goodman, "95 steps to the sky", NEW YORK MAGAZINE, USA, October 2012, p. 50
 Sandra Ballentine, "Profile in style", The New York Times, USA, November 2012, p. 30
 Ian Philipps, "French polish", BELLE, Australia, January 2013, p. 110
 Anne-Marie Cattelain-le Dû, "Un hôtel très particulier", HOTEL & LODGE, April 2013, p. 14
 Sergio Da Silva, "Les objets cultes de Pierre Yovanovitch", ELLE, 29 March 2013, p. 176
 Roberta De Lucca, "Calor com estilo", CASA VOGUE, Brasil, May 2013
 E. Dawson, "Refuge après la bataille", AGEFILIFE, Switzerland, May 2013, p. 63
 Ayesha Khan, "Bringing sexy back", PRESTIGE, Singapore, June 2013, p. 244
 Laurent Montant, "La vie de château", Elle décoration, France, July–August 2013, p. 2
 Félicia Du Rouret, "Écrin Tropézien", Madame Figaro, France, August 2013, p. 82
 Marie Godfrain, "Métamorphoses intérieurs", M le Monde, France, 31 August 2013, p. 63
 Adélaïde De Clermont-Tonnerre, "Les états d’art de Pierre Yovanovitch", Point de vue, September 2013, p. 54
 Eric Jansen, "Art of living", Vogue, China, October 2013, p. 81
 Ian Phillips, "Noble effort", ELLE DECOR, USA, December 2013, p. 132
 Axelle Corty, "Art and Material", Connaissance des Arts, Hong Kong, May 2014, p. 32
 Ian Philliips, "Self-portrait with furniture", Interior Design, USA, July 2014, p. 184
 Thijs Demeulemeester, "Pierre Précieux", Sabato, Belgium, April 2015, p. 14
 Katya Foreman, "The chic of the nouveau", Departures, USA, June 2015, p. 108
 Sean J. Rose, "Renaissance", Numéro, France, July 2015, p. 98

Bibliography 

 "Intérieurs : De Louis XV à Andrée Putman", by Barbara and René Stoeltie, Flammarion, 2013, p. 330 to 339
 "Interiors Now", Margit J. Mayer and Ian Phillips, Tashen, 2013, cover + p. 324 to 333, 
 "Brilliant : White in Design" by Linda O’Keeffe, The Monacelli Press, 2011, p. 156 and 157, p. 166, p. 167 
 "La Magie de Paris Intérieurs d’Exception" by Barbara and René Stoeltie, Fonds Mercator, 2010, "Un Appartement sur Mesure-Pierre Yovanovitch", p. 104 
 "Paris, un Art de Vivre" by Alexandra d’Arnoux and Jacques Denarnaud, Éditions du Chêne-Hachette Livres 2010, "Un Nomade sentimental" p. 206 
 "Regency Redux : Napoleonic, Classical Moderne and Hollywood Regency" by Kelly Wearstler and Emily Evans Eerdmans, Rizzoli, 2008, p. 84 and 85.

Awards and recognition
Yovanovitch received the Talent of Elegance in 2007 at the Talents du Luxe ceremony organized by the Centre for Luxury and Creation. He has given several lectures including the Pavilion of Arts and Design on Swedish furniture and Maison & Objet on renovations in the hotel industry.

In 2010, Yovanovitch is the only French to appear in the "AD100" ranking of the best interior designers and decorators in the world, published by the American magazine Architectural Digest.  In January 2017, and 2018 he is again hailed ranked by the magazinen.

Also in 2018, he joined the A-List ranking of the best architects according to ELLE Décor. architects, published by Architectural Digest USA.

References

French interior designers
People from Nice
1965 births
Living people